Freedom's Just Another Word for Never Getting Paid is the sixth studio album by Gravitar, released in 2001 by Enterruption.

Track listing

Personnel 
Adapted from the Freedom's Just Another Word for Never Getting Paid liner notes.

Gravitar
 Eric Cook – drums, recording, mixing
 Geoff Walker – vocals, electric guitar, horns, recording
 Michael J. Walker – electric guitar

Production and additional personnel
 Anthony Skirvin – cover art
 William Rage – design

Release history

References

External links 
 

2001 albums
Gravitar (band) albums